Nico Mbarga (1 January 1950 – 23 June 1997), better known as Prince Nico Mbarga, was a Cameroonian-Nigerian highlife musician, born to a Nigerian mother and a Cameroonian father in Abakaliki, Nigeria. He is renowned for his hit song "Sweet Mother", recorded with his band Rocafil Jazz, which has been described as the best-selling song in history by an African recording artist.

Personal life 
Mbarga was survived by 10 surviving children; Nico, Descrow, Estelle, Slimphilz, Pauline, Joan, Lillian, Lucy, Lionel, and Nicoline. In 2011, Pauline, one of his children passed on following  a brief illness making nine remaining children. Among the nine Mbarga’s surviving children, only Nico, Descrow, Estelle and Slimphilz are actively involved in music and working to promote their late father’s ‘panco’ style of music. Joan, Lillian, Lucy, Lionel, and Nicoline are said to be either currently engaged in doing business or working white collar jobs at the Nigerian civil service commission.

Music
He played the xylophone, conga, drums, bass guitar and electric guitar. He first started playing in school bands and he made his professional debut as a member of a hotel band, the Melody Orchestra, in 1970.

Career

Early years
Although he only recorded one significant hit, "Sweet Mother," in 1976, which sold more than 13 million copies, Mbarga played an important role in the evolution of African popular music. With his soulful vocals set to the light melodies of his acoustic guitar, Mbarga created a unique hybrid of Nigerian and Congolese guitar playing and uplifting highlife rhythms. He formed his own group, Rocafil Jazz, to perform regularly at the Plaza Hotel in the eastern Nigerian city of Onitsha.

After releasing a disappointing single in 1973, Mbarga and Rocafil Jazz had their first success with their second single, "I No Go Marry My Papa", a regional hit. The band's inability to break past their local following resulted in their recording contract being dropped by EMI, a decision that proved ill-fortuned when the band signed with Rogers All Stars, a Nigerian recording company based in Onitsha, and recorded "Sweet Mother".

Sung in Pidgin, "Sweet Mother" became one of the top sellers in the history of Nigerian music. In the six years that Mbarga and Rocafil Jazz remained with Rogers All Stars, 1975 to 1981, they recorded nine albums.

Later years
On a repeat tour to England in 1982, Mbarga became known for his flamboyant, 1970s glam rock-inspired performances. While he continued to appear with Rocafil Jazz, Mbarga also performed with London-based highlife band the Ivory Coasters and former Rocafil Jazz member, Cameroonian vocalist Louisiana Tilda. Despite Mbarga launching his own Polydor-distributed record label, upon his return to Nigeria, he and the original members of Rocafil Jazz separated after some disagreements. Although he later formed the New Rocafil Jazz Band, Mbarga failed to match his early success. Leaving music, he turned his attention to managing the four-star hotel that he owned, the Sweet Mother Hotel, located in the town of Ikom in Cross River State Nigeria, just minutes away from the Cameroon-Nigeria border.

Death
Prince Nico Mbarga was killed in a motorcycle accident on 23 June 1997 in Calabar  while trying to buy spare parts for his car  along the ever busy Mayne Avenue Road, leaving behind "Sweet Mother" as the most popular song among Nigerians.  "Sweet Mother" is sometimes called "Africa's anthem" and has been voted Africa's favourite song by BBC readers and listeners.

References

External links
Sweet Mother is Africa's anthem
Sweet Mother lyrics
"Radio Netherlands interviews Prince Nico Mbarga", Radio Netherlands Archives

1950 births
1997 deaths
20th-century Nigerian male singers
20th-century Nigerian musicians
Musicians from Abakaliki
Igbo highlife musicians
Igbo songwriters
Nigerian songwriters
Nigerian record producers
Nigerian musicians of Cameroonian descent
Road incident deaths in Nigeria